The Greatest is an online greatest hits compilation album by the underground trip hop/rap rock band Phunk Junkeez, released on June 1, 2010, on Dmaft Records.

Track listing

- All songs with (*) are featured on the bonus track version of the album.

External links
 http://www.cduniverse.com/mp3search.asp?HT_SEARCH_Info=16228419&HT_SEARCH=mp3album&style=mp3
 http://www.phunkjunkeez.com/

2010 compilation albums
Phunk Junkeez albums